Håkan Hedenmalm (born August 25, 1961 in Karlstad) is a Swedish mathematician.

Career 

Hedenmalm has mainly contributed to the development of the theory of Bergman spaces and the associated reproducing kernels in one complex variable. In 1996 he became a professor at Lund University and in 1997 he was elected to KFS, the Royal Physiographic Society in Lund. Later, in 2018, he was elected to DKNVS, the Royal Norwegian Society of Sciences and Letters in Trondheim.

Hedenmalm has collaborated with a number of other mathematicians, in particular with Alexander Borichev, Serguei Shimorin and Nikolai Makarov. Since 2002 he is professor at the Royal Institute of Technology (KTH) in Stockholm.
He has had a number of PhD students. One of them is Ali Abkar.

Distinctions 

He received the Wallenberg Prize in 1992, and in 1996 he was invited speaker at 2ECM (second European Congress of Mathematicians) in Budapest.

In 2000 he received the Göran Gustafsson Prize (KVA). In 2015, he received the Eva and Lars Gårding Prize from KFS, the Royal Physiographic Society in Lund.

Bibliography 

 A comparison between the closed modular ideals in L1(w) and l1(w). Mathematica Scandinavica vol 58, 275–300.
 Outer functions in function algebras on the bidisc. Transactions of the American Mathematical Society vol 306, 697–714
 Translates of functions of two variables. Duke Mathematical Journal vol 58, 251–297. 
 A factorization theorem for square area-integrable analytic functions. Journal für die reine und angewandte Mathematik 422 (1991), 45-68.
 An invariant subspace of the Bergman space having the codimension two property. Journal für die reine und angewandte Mathematik 443 (1993), 1-9.
 (with A. Borichev) Completeness of translates in weighted spaces on the half-line. Acta Mathematica 174 (1995), 1-84.
 (with S. Richter, K. Seip) Interpolating sequences and invariant subspaces of given index in the Bergman spaces. Journal für die reine und angewandte Mathematik 477 (1996), 13-30.
 (with P. Lindqvist, K. Seip) A Hilbert space of Dirichlet series and systems of dilated functions in L2(0,1). Duke Mathematical Journal 86 (1997), 1-37.
 (with A. Borichev) Harmonic functions of maximal growth: invertibility and cyclicity in Bergman spaces. Journal of the American Mathematical Society 10 (1997), 761-796.
 (with J. Gordon) The composition operators on the space of Dirichlet series with square summable coefficients. Michigan Mathematical Journal 46 (1999), 313-329.
 (with S. Shimorin) Hele-Shaw flow on hyperbolic surfaces. Journal de Mathématiques Pures et Appliquées 81 (2002), 187-222.
 (with S. Jakobsson, S. Shimorin) A biharmonic maximum principle for hyperbolic surfaces. Journal für die reine und angewandte Mathematik 550 (2002), 25-75.
 (with S. Shimorin) Weighted Bergman spaces and the integral means spectrum of conformal mappings. Duke Mathematical Journal 127 (2005), 341-393.
 (with A. Baranov) Boundary properties of Green functions in the plane. Duke Mathematical Journal 145 (2008), 1-24.
 (with Y. Ameur, N. Makarov) Berezin transform in polynomial Bergman spaces. Communications on Pure and Applied Mathematics 63 (2010) no. 12, 1533-1584.
 (with A. Montes-Rodriguez) Heisenberg uniqueness pairs and the Klein-Gordon equation. Annals of Mathematics 173 (2011), 1507-1527
 (with Y. Ameur, N. Makarov) Fluctuations of eigenvalues of random normal matrices. Duke Mathematical Journal 159 (2011), 31-81.
 (with N. Makarov) Coulomb gas ensembles and Laplacian growth. Proceedings of the London Mathematical Society (3) 106 (2013), 859-907.
 (with A. Haimi) The polyanalytic Ginibre ensembles. Journal of Statistical Physics 153(1) (2013), 10-47
 (with A. Borichev) Weighted integrability of polyharmonic functions. Advances in Mathematics 264 (2014), 464-505.
 (with A. Haimi) Asymptotic expansion of polyanalytic Bergman kernels. Journal of Functional Analysis 267 (2014), 4667-4731.
 Bloch functions and asymptotic tail variance. Advances in Mathematics 313 (2017), 947-990.
 Bloch functions, asymptotic variance, and geometric zero packing. American Journal of Mathematics 142 (2020), 267–321.

References

External links
 

Swedish mathematicians
Living people
1961 births